Scalphunter (Brian Savage) is a fictional character, a Wild West hero in the DC Comics Universe. Scalphunter first appeared in Weird Western Tales #39 and was created by Sergio Aragones and Joe Orlando.

Fictional character biography
Brian Savage was born at some point during the 1830s to Matt Savage. During his childhood his family's ranch was attacked by Kiowa Indians and young Brian was abducted. The Indians raised him, naming him Ke-Woh-No-Tay ('He Who Is Less Than Human'). His favorite weapons were a bowie knife and a tomahawk, but he was an expert with bow and arrow, revolver and rifle. He also was very good at unarmed combat, using mostly Indian wrestling moves.

Brian ultimately assumed the name "Scalphunter" as he left the tribe that raised him. From there, Brian had many adventures in the old west, fighting the forces of evil and interacting with the likes of Jonah Hex, Bat Lash, and Nighthawk.

Opal City and reincarnation
Eventually returning to white society, Scalphunter abandoned his old alias to resume a normal life as Brian Savage. Brian became sheriff of Opal City, during which time he befriended the Shade, becoming the immortal's best friend and companion. Savage, in 1899, found out about numerous threats made on several Opal storeowners by Opal City's secret Tuesday Club. When attempting to stop the threats, both the storeowners and the vast majority of his team were killed, the storeowners by hanging and his team in a massive blast that levelled Opal City's police station. The only survivor from his team except for himself was the young Carny O'Dare. Seeking revenge, Savage hunted down and killed all the members of the Tuesday Club, removing a major threat to Opal's safety. Shortly after this, the final survivor of the Club's massacre and final inductee, Jason Melville, killed him. Melville was subsequently killed by O'Dare in retaliation. Savage, however, was hailed a hero for the destruction of the club. Steve Savage, the World War I hero known as the Balloon Buster, is his son, something he revealed to Shade as he lay dying.

The 1990s series Starman featured the character Matt O'Dare, who was revealed to be the reincarnation of Savage. It was also suggested that Savage would be reincarnated again and become the future hero Star Boy.

He also made an appearance in the 12-issue miniseries, The Kents, alongside its main character.

In the Weird Western Tales #71 tie-in to the Blackest Night crossover, Scalphunter was reanimated as a member of the Black Lantern along with Black Lantern Jonah Hex and Bat Lash.

In other media

Novels
Scalphunter appeared in DC Universe: Trail of Time by Jeff Mariotte, which was released on 02/28/07. He teamed up with Superman, the Phantom Stranger, Etrigan the Demon, Jonah Hex, Bat Lash, and El Diablo to battle Mordru, Felix Faust, and Vandal Savage.

Music
He is the main character of Judge Rock's song Westerner, along with Jonah Hex, Johnny Thunder and other DC heroes appearing during episode three of Crisis on Infinite Earths. The lyrics say: "The redskin had painted his mask, a wigwam on his eyes. A Kiowa shaman was his guise, the magic he kept in a sack. Scalphunter was his name".

References

External links
 DCU Guide entry on Scalphunter

Characters created by Joe Orlando
Comics characters introduced in 1977
DC Comics Western (genre) characters
Fictional archers
DC Comics police officers
Fictional knife-fighters
DC Comics male characters
Fictional people from the 19th-century

de:Weird Western Tales#Scalphunter